Garcinia kingii is a species of flowering plant in the family Clusiaceae. It is found only in the Andaman Islands. It is threatened by habitat loss.

References

Endangered plants
kingii
Flora of the Andaman Islands
Taxonomy articles created by Polbot